Awwal Number is a 1990 Indian sports action film directed by Dev Anand. It stars Dev Anand, Aamir Khan, Ekta Sohini, Neeta Puri, Aditya Pancholi in pivotal roles.

Plot
A new star Sunny has been included in the team in place of another famous star Ronny. The fame and hype of the new star creates hatred in the heart of Ronny against Sunny, although Sunny respects him. Ronny decides to take revenge on Sunny; meanwhile a terrorist decides to put a bomb in the field where a match is to be organised between India and Australia.

DIG Vikram Singh discovers the terrorists' plan and foils the attack, saving thousands of lives. Sunny also becomes a star by playing a match-winning stroke for the country.

Cast

Dev Anand as DIG Vikram Singh "Vicky"
Aamir Khan as Sunny
Ekta Sohini as Aarti
Neeta Puri as Maria
Aditya Pancholi as Ranveer Singh "Rony"
Kulbhushan Kharbanda as Kundi
Sudhir Pandey as Sundaram
Vikram Gokhale
Parikshat Sahni in a special appearance as a Selection committee member 
Ram Mohan in a special appearance as a Selection committee member 
Anjan Srivastav as In a special appearance as a Cricket commentator
Aftab Shivdasani as Young Sunny
Bharat Bhushan as Sunny's Grandfather
Birbal as Chhaganlal
Sameer Khakkar as Terrorist
Raj Kishore in a special appearance as a Bartender
Mac Mohan as Mani
Cindy Crawford as Vicky's step mother in the picture
Subbiraj as Police Commissioner Patil
Ajit Vachani as Police Inspector

Soundtrack
The music was composed By Bappi Lahiri and the lyrics were by Amit Khanna. Voices were rendered by Asha Bhosle, Amit Kumar, Bappi Lahiri, Udit Narayan and S. Janaki.

Production 
Aamir Khan and his father were admirers of Dev Anand and Aamir quoted in an interview after Dev Anand's death: "The only film I signed without reading the script was Awwal Number."  Anand had initially offered the role of Ranvir Singh to cricketer Imran Khan.

References

External links
 

1990 films
1990s Hindi-language films
Films about cricket in India
Films directed by Dev Anand
Films scored by Bappi Lahiri
Sports action films